The 2018 Liga 3 Papua is a qualifying round for the national round of 2018 Liga 3. Persewar Waropen, the winner of the 2017 Liga 3 Papua are the defending champions. The competition will begin on June 30, 2018.

Format
In this competition, 20 teams are divided into 2 groups of seven and 1 groups of six. The two best teams are through to knockout stage. The winner will represent Papua in national round of 2018 Liga 3.

Teams
There are initially 20 clubs which will participate the league in this season..

Group stage
This stage scheduled starts on 30 June 2018.

Group A

Group B

Group C

References 

2018 in Indonesian football
Seasons in Asian third tier association football leagues